RTV Doboj or РТВ Добој is a local Bosnian public cable television channel based in city of Doboj. Program is mainly produced in Serbian.

Radio Doboj  is also part of public municipality services.

References

External links 
 Official website of RTV Doboj
 Website of CRA BiH

Television stations in Bosnia and Herzegovina